Guno may refer to:

People
 Guno Berenstein (born 1967), Dutch judoka
 Guno Castelen, Surinamese politician
 Guno Hoen (1922–2010), Surinamese football player and sports journalist
 Guno Kwasie (born 1985), Surinamese football player
 Larry Guno (1940–2005), Canadian celebrity

Places